Reincke is a German language surname. Notable people with the name include:
 Frederick G. Reincke (1899–1980), United States Army general
 Heinz Reincke (1925–2011), German-born actor

References 

German-language surnames
Surnames from given names